Mike Preston ( – ) was a Welsh wheelchair curler.

Teams

References

External links 

1944 births
2009 deaths
Welsh male curlers
Welsh wheelchair curlers
Place of birth missing
Place of death missing